The Informers (US title - Underworld Informers) is a 1963 British crime film produced and distributed in the UK by The Rank Organisation and distributed in the USA by Continental Film Distributors.  It was directed by Ken Annakin and produced by William MacQuitty, with the screenplay by Paul Durst and Alun Falconer from the novel Death of a Snout by Douglas Warner. It stars Nigel Patrick, Margaret Whiting, Harry Andrews, Derren Nesbitt and Colin Blakely. Cinematography was by Reginald H. Wyer. It was filmed at Pinewood Studios and on location in London.

Plot 
The story concerns the uneasy relationship between a Scotland Yard Detective, Johnnoe, and the Squad Chief, Bestwick, over the formerly traditional use of "snouts" (paid informants). Despite being told that these should no longer be used and to adopt more scientific principles of detection, Johnnoe continues to do so until one of his informants is murdered. He again disobeys orders and pursues his own lines of inquiry but as he closes in on the villains, they frame him for corruption and he is arrested and held in prison. With few friends left on his side of the law, his wife enlists the help of the murdered man's brother.

Cast

Production
The Informers was filmed at various locations around London, including the Thames Embankment, Westminster, Soho, Paddington, Covent Garden, Hampstead and Golders Green.

References

External links 
 
 

1963 films
British crime films
1963 crime films
Films directed by Ken Annakin
Films scored by Clifton Parker
Films shot at Pinewood Studios
1960s English-language films
1960s British films